National Route 314 is a national highway of Japan connecting Fukuyama, Hiroshima and Unnan, Shimane in Japan, with a total length of 142.4 km (88.48 mi).

References

National highways in Japan
Roads in Hiroshima Prefecture
Roads in Shimane Prefecture